Oa is a fictional planet that lies at the center of the DC Comics universe. Since its inception, Oa has been the planetary citadel of the Guardians of the Universe and headquarters of the Green Lantern Corps. It first appeared in Green Lantern (vol. 2) #1, when the Guardians summoned Hal Jordan's "energy duplicate" so they could hear of his origin.

History 
One of the oldest planets in the universe, Oa serves as the home and headquarters for a race of blue-skinned powerful humanoids called the Guardians of the Universe. The Guardians administer the Green Lantern Corps, a group of powerful universal police officers equipped by the Guardians with green-colored power rings along with green lanterns with which to charge the rings. According to the story "Heart of a Star" in the Sandman: Endless Nights graphic novel, Oa's star is called Sto-Oa (the Light of Oa) by the children of the planet's inhabitants. Its location has been firmly established by numerous references in Green Lantern comics over the years. It was formerly the center of the universe until the events of Infinite Crisis.

Oa's history is not clear; according to some stories, the Guardians originated on a planet called Maltus. These evolved Maltusians later moved to Oa and named themselves Oans. Oa became a convenient base of operations. Other stories had the Oans living there from the beginning.

Oa appears primarily as a desert-like, lifeless planet except for the Guardians' city which contains the Corps Central Battery and various halls, living quarters, containment cells and training centers for the Green Lantern Corps. It serves basically as a planet-sized all-in-one police station, training grounds and prison.

During a period where the planet had been abandoned and the Central Battery destroyed, Oa spent some time as a patchwork mosaic of cities from other planets similar to Battleworld. This transformation was due to a rogue Guardian driven insane by solitude. When the Guardians returned to Oa, Mosaic was kept as an experiment in inter-galactic cooperative living. 

Green Lantern Corps member Hal Jordan, the Green Lantern of sector 2814 (which includes Earth), under the influence of the evil entity Parallax, kills all but one of the Guardians and most of the Corps before draining Oa's Central Power Battery of its energy.  During the final Zero Hour: Crisis in Time battle with Hal Jordan, Kyle Rayner destroys the planet in an attempt to defeat Hal. 

In the crossover Green Lantern vs the Silver Surfer, the Marvel Universe villain Thanos attempts to use the rift created by Oa's destruction to unmake the multiverse, after tricking Kyle into powering his equipment with his ring. Thanos is confronted by Parallax and their powers are drained by Kyle and the Surfer, apparently destroying the rift. During the Circle of Fire event, what remains of the planet served as a base of operations for the villain Oblivion.

The planet is reformed sometime later by Jordan's old friend and associate Tom "Pie-Face" Kalmaku in the graphic novel Legacy: The Last Will and Testament of Hal Jordan. The Central Power Battery is later recharged and the Guardians resurrected shortly thereafter by Kyle Rayner after he spends some time as the near-omnipotent "Ion", Kyle sacrificing his power to restore the Guardians rather than risk becoming as dangerous as Hal-as-Parallax.

After attacks by Superboy-Prime and the Spider Guild, the Guardians fortify Oa by creating a planetwide armor and defensive system to prevent attacks. The full capability of the new systems is still unknown. They were not, however, enough to prevent an assault by the Sinestro Corps, which resulted in the deaths of many Green Lanterns. Afterward, the Corps doubled its defenses. However, a rogue Guardian, Scar, weakened its defenses for an attack from the Black Lantern Corps.

After Sinestro killed the Guardians for their "Third Army" plot and their part in Korugar's destruction by the First Lantern Volthoom—although he spared and exiled both Ganthet and Sayd—Hal Jordan became the new leader of the Green Lantern Corps. Shortly after this, the planet was attacked and destroyed by Relic.

The Green Lanterns' new base of operations following the destruction of Oa became Mogo.

Following the rebirth of the Guardians of the Universe and the Hal Jordan's victory over Hank Henshaw, it was revealed by Ganthet that the Guardians were rebuilding Oa in secret with the plans to restore it to what it once was, which is now referred to as "New Oa".

Legion of Super-Heroes
It is revealed in Final Crisis: Legion of 3 Worlds that Sodam Yat is the last Guardian of the Universe in the 31st century, while Rond Vidar is the last remaining Green Lantern until he is killed by Superboy-Prime's Legion of Super-Villains. Oa lies mostly in ruins, the power battery cracked, and the rings of the Corps lie in a pile, unable to locate new bearers due to the apparent death of Mogo. Statues of legendary Green Lantern Corps members, including Hal Jordan, Guy Gardner, John Stewart, Kyle Rayner, Arisia, and Ch'p, line the hall where the Guardians formerly met.

Green Lanterns Corps Headquarters 
Dining Hall: The dining hall can accommodate any Green Lantern's nutritional needs. The executive chef, Greet, specializes in replicating dishes from across the universe. He, unfortunately, has trouble replicating the vast number of foods from Earth.
The Foundry: Forge of the Green Lantern rings and the Green Lantern battery.  It is underground about two miles from the Central Power Battery and is guarded by an alien creature.
Hall of Great Service: Housing the massive Book of Oa—the Corps' lawbook and bible—the Hall of Great Service is a library of the stories and deeds of the finest Green Lanterns of all time. Like his father before him, Tomar-Tu recently took the position of archivist superior, filing every tale as it comes in.
Hazard Simulation Facility: All rookie Green Lanterns endure a series of tests to determine their viability in the field. The hazard simulation facility allows for safe, non-lethal training scenarios to be enacted.
Meeting Hall: Lanterns receive their briefings and assignments in the central meeting hall.
Memorial Hall: A memorial erected to Green Lanterns who lost their lives in the line of duty. A Green Lantern named Morro and his pet dratures are its crypt keepers.
New Warriors: A new restaurant owned by Guy Gardner, serving Earth's American fast foods, dinners, and both non-alcoholic and alcoholic beverages.
The Sciencells: The sciencells were constructed to contain the most ruthless criminals in the universe. They currently hold such prisoners as Lyssa Drak, Evil Star, Igneous Man, Grayven, and Alexander Nero. Superboy-Prime was the only inmate who wasn't imprisoned in a sciencell. The Guardians and the Green Lantern Corps sent him to a quantum containment field surrounded by a red Sun-Eater and guarded by fifty Green Lanterns. The Green Lantern Voz acts as warden of the sciencells. No inmate has ever been rehabilitated successfully.
Sector Houses: These safe houses allow Lanterns to hold criminals as they await escort back to the Oan sciencells. Limited recreational facilities are available to accommodate Green Lanterns in their travels.

Book of Oa 
After Thomas Kalmaku used Jordan's ring to rebuild Oa, Kyle Rayner used his power as Ion to resurrect the Guardians. The book of Oa is now restored.

The Forbidden Chapter of the Book tells the prophecy of the Blackest Night, the final destruction of the Green Lantern Corps at the hands of their greatest enemies as it was told to Abin Sur by the demons of Ysmault.

Upon recruitment, a Green Lantern is expected to uphold certain principles of their duty. These principles include:
 The protection of life and liberty within the assigned sector.
 Following the orders of the Guardians without question.
 Noninterference with a planet's culture, political structure, or its population's collective will.
 Acting within local laws and obeying local authority within reason (presumably, the Guardians' orders can overrule this when necessary).
 Taking no action against anyone or anything until they are proven to be a threat against life and liberty.
 Avoiding the use of equipment, resources or authority of the Corps for personal gain.
 Showing respect for and cooperating with other members of the Corps and the Guardians.
 Showing respect for life which includes restraint of force unless there is no reasonable alternative.
 Giving top priority to the greatest danger in the assigned sector.
 Upholding the honor of the Corps.

The book of Oa has been designated off-limits after being rewritten by the Guardians of the Universe to include ten new laws. Only the first four have been revealed:
 Lethal force is authorized against the Sinestro Corps.
 Lethal force is authorized against all enemies of the Green Lantern Corps. This law was later repealed by Corps leader John Stewart during the war against the Darkstars, believing that the Green Lanterns are more than about winning battles, and need to focus on winning the love and support of the universe around them to prove their way of standing up for Justice is better than the Darkstars way of executing known criminals.
 Physical relationships and love between Green Lanterns is forbidden within the Corps. This law is later repealed and relationships between Green Lanterns are allowed following the Blackest Night event.
 The Vega System is no longer outside of Green Lantern Corps' jurisdiction.

When the new laws are written, the book is revealed to be written in Interlac, the galactic universal language used by the 30th and 31st Century United Planets and Legion of Super-Heroes.

To enforce these principles, the Guardians closely monitor the activities of the Lanterns. If they feel a violation of Corps regulations occurred, they will summon the offender to Oa and hold a trial in which the charges are read and the Lantern is allowed to explain their actions. If the Guardians are not satisfied by the explanation, they have a number of disciplinary options which include:
Probation
Personal supervision by the Guardians on Oa
Temporary exile from the Lantern's homeworld
Ritual Trial of Endurance (a Lantern must attempt a dangerous passage through the Anti-Matter Universe)
Expulsion from the Corps
Prime Duty (when Superboy-Prime was an Oan prisoner, guard duty was used for punishment)

In other media

Television
 Oa appears in the animated series Justice League. Here it appears as a rocky planet with only a single structure where the Guardians Citadel, the Central Power Battery and Green Lantern Corps are housed.
 Oa appears in the Duck Dodgers episode "The Green Loontern". Here, Duck Dodgers accidentally gets his hands on a Green Lantern ring and suit, and helps the last members of the Green Lantern Core fight Sinestro.
 Oa is one of the main locations seen in Green Lantern: The Animated Series. It is well settled, with massive skyscrapers located every where on the planet. From space the planet is seen to have two rings encircling it, one in the north and one in the south. The massive cities below give a circular appearance on the surface from space. Altogether it gives the planet an appearance of a Green Lantern Battery.

Film
 Oa appears in the animated film Green Lantern: Emerald Knights.

 Oa appears in the 2011 live-action film Green Lantern. The planet has several points of green light shooting from the surface into space. It has large cities and skyscrapers covering its surface. The Guardians Citadel is one of the tallest structures, with the Guardians chamber atop it. The Central Power Battery is underground in the planet's center, and from there it sends out the points of light seen from space. The Green Lantern Corps has a large meeting chamber near the Central Power Battery.
Oa appears in the animated film Justice League Dark: Apokolips War, in which the planet has been conquered by Darkseid after the Green Lantern Corps were killed. The last surviving Green Lantern is John Stewart, who attempts to recharge his ring using the Central Power Battery but is incinerated (along with the battery itself) when some of Earth's molten core is dumped onto the planet.

Videogames
Oa is a central hub in the video game Lego Batman 3: Beyond Gotham as a main hub, and is the only free roam spot in the game that can be used to drive vehicles and unlock more.

References

External links 
 The Green Lantern Corps Web Page Great Book of Oa

DC Comics dimensions
DC Comics planets
Green Lantern

de:DC-Universum#Planeten